Wang Lingji (September 10, 1883 – 17 March 1967) was a Kuomintang general from Sichuan. In 1913, he fought against the Beiyang government and the Chinese Workers' and Peasants' Red Army. He commanded the 30th Army Group from April 1938 to October 1945. He fought against the Imperial Japanese Army in Hubei; Jiangxi and Hunan.

Chinese Civil War and later life
He was provincial chairman of Jiangxi from March 1946 to April 1948 and provincial chairman of his home province from April 1948 to December 1949. On December 11, 1949, Sichuan clique warlords Deng Xihou and Liu Wenhui surrendered Chengdu to the advancing People's Liberation Army, resulting in Wang's arrest by the forces of the Communist Party of China. Wang was imprisoned by the authorities of the People's Republic of China until December 1964. He died of heart disease and hypertension at the age of 83 in a hospital in Beijing, unable to receive medical treatment due to the Cultural Revolution.

References

Bibliography
 劉識非「王陵基」
 
 
 

People from Leshan
National Revolutionary Army generals from Sichuan
1883 births
1967 deaths